Lappeenranta Airport  is an international airport in Lappeenranta, Finland. It is 2.5 kilometers southwest of the city center and Lappeenranta Central Station. Opened in 1918, Lappeenranta Airport is the oldest airport still in operation in Finland. The Karelia Aviation Museum is in the airport. Flight go on low altitude straight over Lappeenranta midtown which is located 1½ kilometer (1 mile) from the eastern end of the runway.

History
The airport opened in 1918. Between 1939 and 1944, during World War II, the airport operated as a military air base.

In 1951, passenger traffic began at the airport. In 1960, the existing terminal was completed. In 1998, the runway was extended to 2,500 metres. In September 2006, the railway between Lahti and Kerava opened, shortening the travel time by rail to Helsinki and caused the closure of the Lappeenranta-Helsinki air route.

In March 2010, Ryanair started flights to Lappeenranta, its second destination in Finland after Tampere Airport. The passenger record was in 2010 with 115,000 passengers. The airport was in 2014 on 73nd position in the list of the busiest airports in the Nordic countries. The only airline flying to Lappeenranta, Ryanair, ceased all flights there on 21 October 2015.

In 2016, ownership of the airport changed from the state-owned Finavia to a company owned by the City of Lappeenranta, Lappeenrannan Lentoasema Oy. The airport had no scheduled flights 2016–2017, but Ryanair restarted again in March 2018.

Airlines and destinations

The following airlines operate regular scheduled and charter flights at the airport:

In addition to the scheduled passenger service listed above, there are a few seasonal air charters to European holiday destinations.

Statistics

Ground transportation
Local bus number 4, which departs in front of the airport terminal, operates service to/from the city center and Lappeenranta railway station. Taxi service is also available. From the railway station, further connections to Helsinki are offered by VR, Savonlinja, and OnniBus.com. The distance from midtown by road to the terminal is 2½ kilometer (1½ mile).

References

External links

 
 
 

Airports in Finland
Airport
Buildings and structures in South Karelia
International airports in Finland